This is a List of state highways in South Carolina. These state highways are owned and maintained by the U.S. state of South Carolina, through the South Carolina Department of Transportation (SCDOT).


List of primary routes 
Since its establishment, there have been countless removals and reestablishment of highways in the state (check notes for current or last form count). Typically, it is that one highway wins favor over another; while the other highway is either absorbed or downgraded to a secondary road.

List of alternate routes 
South Carolina alternate routes have been utilized in a multitude of ways, including business, bypass, cut-thru and spurs.  Today, only one alternate route is currently active in the state.

List of business loops 
South Carolina business routes were first established in 1949.  All business routes in the state are set up as a loop, meaning it will separate then converge back to the main highway.  Typically, they serve to connect downtown areas in cities and towns in the state.

List of other special routes 

South Carolina, on rare occasion, will utilize other uniquely bannered routes in the state.  Listed here are connector routes, truck routes, and spur routes.

References

External links

 
State